Jonathan Gagnoud (born 24 March 1988) is a French-Swiss footballer who plays as a defender.

References

Living people
1988 births
Association football defenders
Swiss men's footballers
Swiss-French people
Swiss expatriate footballers
Urania Genève Sport players
AJ Auxerre players